Goodwood Stakes may refer to:

Awesome Again Stakes, an American horserace, formerly known as the Goodwood Stakes
Goodwood Stakes, a UK horserace, run over 2 miles 5 furlongs at Goodwood Racecourse